Ken Thomas (February 11, 1960 — November 13, 2002) was a professional American football running back who played in the National Football League (NFL). He played college football at San José State University.

Early life and high school
Thomas was born and grew up in Hanford, California and attended Hanford High School, where he competed in football, track and basketball. Thomas was inducted into the school's Hall of Fame in 2010.

College career
Thomas was named All-Pacific Coast Athletic Association in 1979 and 1981, when he was also a second-team NEA All-America selection. Thomas tied the school record with 14 interceptions and holds the record for interceptions returned for touchdowns in a season (3) and for a career (5). Thomas also ran track at SJSU and was named an All-American 1981 as a member of the Spartans' 400-meter relay team that finished fifth at the NCAA championships.

Professional career
Thomas was selected in the seventh round of the 1983 NFL Draft by the Kansas City Chiefs. He was moved to running back in the preseason and rushed for 55 yards on 15 carries and caught 28 passes for 236 yards and one touchdown. Thomas injured his knee in a preseason game in 1984 an spent the season on injured reserve and 1985 on the physically unable to perform list before ultimately retiring.

Personal life
Thomas's older brother, Jewerl Thomas, also played football at SJSU and in the NFL. Thomas died in 2002.

References

1960 births
2002 deaths
American football running backs
San Jose State Spartans football players
Kansas City Chiefs players
Players of American football from California
People from Hanford, California
American football defensive backs
San Jose State Spartans men's track and field athletes